Daniel Wende (born 24 July 1984) is a German pair skater. With Maylin Wende, he is the 2010 Trophée Eric Bompard bronze medalist, the 2013 Nebelhorn Trophy silver medalist, and a two-time German national champion. They have competed twice at the Winter Olympics (2010, 2014) and have placed as high as sixth at the European Championships (2011, 2014).

Career

Early career 
After starting out as a singles skater, Wende switched to pair skating at about the age of 16–17. His first partner was Rebecca Handke. The pair twice won the German national junior title and then won the senior silver medal the next two years. They competed at five European Championships and placed as high as sixth (2005). They were also sent to two World Junior Championships, placing eleventh in 2004 and withdrawing in 2005. Their partnership ended in 2007.

Later in 2007, Wende teamed up with Russian skater Ekaterina Vasilieva. They won the bronze medal at the German Championships before deciding to split.

Partnership with Maylin Wende (Hausch) 
Wende teamed up with Maylin Hausch in September 2008, though their training was initially limited due to a ruptured ligament in his right foot. They train in Oberstdorf and are coached by Karel Fajfr.

In the 2010–11 season, Hausch/Wende won a bronze medal at a Grand Prix event, the 2010 Trophée Eric Bompard.

In 2011–12, the pair placed fourth at the 2011 Nebelhorn Trophy. They were eighth at the 2011 Skate America with Hausch suffering from tendinitis in her foot. At the 2012 European Championships, Hausch/Wende finished seventh. On January 26, during the morning practice before the long programs, Wende collided with Mari Vartmann while they were attempting to avoid a French pair.

Hausch/Wende's training for 2012–13 season began late due to death and illness in their families; as a result, they withdrew from the 2012 Cup of Russia. Wende experienced a spinal disc herniation in autumn 2012. The pair withdrew from the 2013 German Championships. They were named in the German team to the 2013 European Championships but withdrew as well due to his back problem. Wende was diagnosed with a second herniated disc in January 2013.

The pair began competing as Maylin Wende / Daniel Wende in the 2013–14 season.

Personal life 
Hausch and Wende were married in June 2013.

Programs

With Hausch

With Handke

Competitive highlights

With Hausch

With Vasilieva

With Handke

References

External links 

 
 
 
 
 

German male pair skaters
1984 births
Living people
Sportspeople from Essen
Figure skaters at the 2010 Winter Olympics
Figure skaters at the 2014 Winter Olympics
Olympic figure skaters of Germany